Scolopini is a tribe of bugs in the family Lyctocoridae. There are at least 4 genera and about 10 described species in Scolopini.

Genera
Two subtribes belong to the tribe Scolopini:
subtribe Calliodina Carayon
 Calliodis Reuter, 1871 i c g b
 Eulasiocolpus Champion, 1900
 Lasiocolpoides Champion, 1900
 Lepidonannella Poppius, 1913
 Zopherocoris Reuter, 1871
subtribe Scolopina Carayon, 1954
 Lasiochiloides Champion, 1900
 Scolopa Carayon, 1954
 Scolopella Carayon, 1954
 Scolopocoris Carayon, 1972
 Scoloposcelis Fieber, 1864
unplaced genera
 Maoricoris China, 1933
 Nidicola Harris and Drake, 1941 i c g
 Solenonotus Reuter, 1871 i c g
Data sources: i = ITIS, c = Catalogue of Life, g = GBIF, b = Bugguide.net

References

Further reading

External links

 

 
Lyctocoridae
Hemiptera tribes
Articles created by Qbugbot